Krastë or Krasta may refer to:

Krastë, Berat, a village in southern Albania
Krastë, Dibër, a town in northeastern Albania